Siame O'Brien (born 25 August 1984), better known by his stage names OC Osilliation or OC, is a recording artist and producer from Lusaka, Zambia.  He is also the CEO of recording studio Obama Records and Entertainment; which has produced four studio albums.  OC has also released several top selling singles, including "Folo Folo",  " Wangu ni Wangu",  "Wacha Wachema",  "Rafiki",  and "Last Forever" which continue to be fan favorites and most requested.

His song  "Wacha Wachema" from his first album titled My Name is OC won an award for Best Reggae music at the Born and Bread Awards.

Awards and nominations

Awards won 
 2008 Born And Bred Award for Best Reggae – "Wacha Wachema" ft Petersen
 2012 Born and Bred award for Best collaborative song –  "Lastforever"

Nominations 
 2014 – Best Ni Yatu( Zed Beats) Album: OC (Folo Folo Me).

Discography

Albums 
 My Name Is OC
 Wangu Ni Wangu
 Goose Bumps
 Folo Folo

Selected music 
 "Fwenya"
 "Beautiful"
 "Confident"
 "Bumaye"
 "Goose Bumps"
 "Hotline Bling" (Cover)
 "Maria"
 "Oh Na Na Na"
 "Selfie"
 "Ngoma"

References 

1984 births
Living people
21st-century Zambian male singers
People from Lusaka